| show-medals    =
| updated        =
}}

Laura Jane Baldwin (born 17 January 1980) is a British sailor who competed in the 2004 Summer Olympics sailing the Europe dinghy.

Career highlights

2004 Athens Olympics - British Olympic Sailor in the women’s one person event, the Europe Class
2006 - ISAF World Ranked #2 in the Laser Radial class
2008 Beijing Olympics - Australian Team Media and Marketing
2010 - Australian Laser Radial Women’s Champion & Bronze medalist in the ISAF Women’s Match Racing World Championships
2012 London Olympics - Sailing Coach to Krystal Weir (AUS)
2016 Rio Olympics - Sailing Coach to Maria Erdi (HUN)

Activism 
In 2020, Baldwin joined Ocean Rebellion protests against cruise ships moored off Weymouth during the global COVID-19 pandemic. She is a spokesperson for Extinction Rebellion.

In October 2021, Baldwin was part of a group of Extinction Rebellion activists blockading the entrance to Fawley Refinery in Hampshire, alongside fellow Olympian Etienne Stott.

References

External links
 
 
 
 
 

1980 births
Living people
British female sailors (sport)
Olympic sailors of Great Britain
Sailors at the 2004 Summer Olympics – Europe
Medalists at the 2004 Summer Olympics
Olympic silver medallists for Great Britain